Luke's Busy Day is a 1917 American short comedy film starring Harold Lloyd.

Cast
 Harold Lloyd - Lonesome Luke
 Bebe Daniels
 Snub Pollard
 Bud Jamison
 Sidney De Gray
 Earl Mohan

See also
 Harold Lloyd filmography

References

External links

1917 films
1917 short films
1917 comedy films
American silent short films
American black-and-white films
Films directed by Hal Roach
Silent American comedy films
Lonesome Luke films
American comedy short films
1910s American films